is a TV station broadcasting in Kagawa and Okayama Prefectures. It is a member station of the All-Nippon News Network (ANN).

History 

 November 22, 1967: Established as Shin-nihon Broadcasting
 April 1, 1969: Analog TV Broadcasting started
 December 1, 2006: Digital TV Broadcasting started
 July 24, 2011: Analog TV Broadcasting ended
 January 18, 2021: Moved to its new headquarters in Kaminocho, Takamatsu City, Kagawa Prefecture from its former headquarters in Saihōchō Itchōme, Takamatsu, Kagawa Prefecture.

Offices 
 Headquarters: 2-1-43 Kaminocho, Takamatsu City, Kagawa Prefecture
 Okayama Office: 1–18, Daiku San-chōme, Kita-ku, Okayama, Japan
 Tokyo Branch Office: 6–7, Ginza Roku-chōme, Chūō, Tokyo, Japan
 Osaka Branch Office: 2–4, Nakanoshima San-chōme, Kita-ku, Osaka, Japan
 Hiroshima Branch Office: 15–6, Hatchōbori, Naka-ku, Hiroshima, Japan

Network 
 ANN and TV Asahi Network

Stations

Analog 
 Okayama JOVH-TV 25CH 20 kW

Kagawa
 Takamatsu 33CH 5 kW
 Nishisanuki 42CH 3 kW
 Shōdoshima 57CH 300W
 Shionoe V4CH 3W
 Sakaidenishi 38CH 10W
 Shirotori 42CH 10W
 Nio 54CH 3W
 Sakaidehigashi 56CH 10W
 Kokubunji 57CH 3W
 Takuma 57CH 1W
 Shido 58CH 10W etc...

Okayama
 Kasaoka V55CH 300W
 Tsuyama 62CH 500W
 Mizushima V16CH 10W
 Okayamakita 16CH 10W
 Takahashi 26CH 10W
 Niimi 26CH 30W
 Kuse 26CH 10W
 Mimasaka 26CH 3W
 Tamashima 33CH 3W
 Tsuyamaminami 33CH 3W
 Okayamahigashi 37CH 3W

Digital (virtual channel:5) 
 Okayama JOVH-DTV 30CH 2 kW

Kagawa
 Takamatsu 17CH 500W
 Nishisanuki 17CH 100W
 Shōdoshima 30CH 30W
 Shirotori 30CH 1W
 Nio 30CH 1W
 Sakaidehigashi 31CH 1W
 Tonoshō 34CH 1W
 Kokubunji 26CH 0.3W
 Ayakami 36CH 0.3W
 Takuma 31CH 0.1W
 Takuma-Nabuto 30CH 0.05W
 Takuma-Namari 31CH 0.01W

Okayama
 Tsuyama 17CH 50W
 Kasaoka V30CH 30W
 Niimi 17CH 3W
 Hiruzen 30CH 3W
 Kojima 49CH 3W
 Kuse 17CH 1W
 Takahashi 17CH 1W
 Wake 17CH 1W
 Hokubou 31CH 1W
 San'yō 36CH 1W
 Bizen-Seto 42CH 1W
 Ibara 17CH 0.3W etc...

Programs 
 Nikomaru Wide
 KSB Super J Channel
 KSB News
 KSB News view
 Saikyō! Dream Hyakkaten
 Jiyūjin Kaisyajin - Top no Yokogao

References

External links 
 

All-Nippon News Network
Television stations in Japan
Television channels and stations established in 1969
Mass media in Takamatsu, Kagawa